Lerum is a locality and the seat of Lerum Municipality in Västra Götaland County, Sweden. It had 16,855 inhabitants in 2010.

Overview
Lerum has a station on the Gothenburg commuter rail system and is a suburb of Gothenburg.

The river of Säveån runs through Lerum municipality.  of it is surrounded by the nature reserve Säveåns Naturreservat, where bridges dating back as far as the 18th century as well as a variety of animal life and beautiful nature can be found.

Lerum train crash

Lerum hit the world's news bulletins on November 16, 1987, when two Intercity trains collided just outside the local station, killing 9 and injuring 140.

A control cable to the trailroad switches had been incorrectly reconnected after being dug up accidentally. When traffic was finally allowed to pass the station, the Gothenburg bound train was switched over to the opposite track where an outbound train was arriving, after a mistake in communication between the repairer and the traffic leader.
An off-duty trainmaster, reading the paper in one of the locomotives, heard the train driver say "Helvete nu smäller det" (roughly translated: "Hell, now that's a crash"). He managed to open the side door and leap out, the trains collided when he was still in the air and despite doing this at  he survived with just a broken foot.

The involved locomotives were Rc4 1292 and 1300, they were scrapped on the spot.

Schools
There are several schools in Lerum. (incomplete list)
 Torpskolan
 Rydsbergsskolan
 Aspenässkolan
 Lerums gymnasium
 Knappekullaskolan
 Almekärrsskolan
 Hulanskolan

Sports
The following sports clubs are located in Lerum:
 Lerums BK
 Lerums IS
 FBC Lerum
 Lerums Landhockey

International relations

Twin towns – Sister cities
Lerum is twinned with:
 Aalborg, Denmark
 Baldone, Latvia

Notable people 

 Joel Berghult, musician and YouTuber

References 

Populated places in Västra Götaland County
Populated places in Lerum Municipality
Municipal seats of Västra Götaland County
Swedish municipal seats